Joseph Brook and Co. was the earliest organ maker in Scotland, in business from the early 19th century.

Notable works 
Brook and Co. installed organs in the following buildings:

 Dunoon Free Church, Dunoon, Scotland (1895)

References 

Organ builders of the United Kingdom